Nakhon Pathom may refer to
the town Nakhon Pathom
Nakhon Pathom Province
Nakhon Pathom district